Cougar Fight Song may refer to:

Cougar Fight Song (University of Houston), the fight song of the University of Houston
The Cougar Song (BYU), the fight song of Brigham Young University